Helena Vale may refer to:

 Helena Vale, Western Australia
 Municipality of Helena Vale, a former municipality in the Perth metropolitan area
Helena Vale Racecourse, a former racecourse in Perth, Western Australia
Helena Vale Brickworks, a former brickworks in Midland, Western Australia

See also
Helena Valley